AM General is an American heavy vehicle and contract automotive manufacturer based in South Bend, Indiana. It is best known for the civilian Hummer and the military Humvee that are assembled in Mishawaka, Indiana. For a relatively brief period, 1974–1979, the company also manufactured transit buses, making more than 5,400 of them.

Corporate history 
AM General traces its roots to the Standard Wheel Company of Terre Haute, Indiana, which expanded in 1903 to include the Overland Automotive Division. In 1908, John North Willys purchased the Overland company, then based in Indianapolis, Indiana, and renamed it Willys-Overland Motors. In the 1940s, as Willys, it collaborated with Ford to develop a vehicle to US Army specifications. It then mass-produced that vehicle as "America's first four-wheel-drive, one-fourth-ton, tactical utility truck"—the Jeep of World War II fame. In 1953, Kaiser Motors purchased Willys-Overland, changing its name first to Kaiser-Willys Motor Company, and in 1963, to Kaiser-Jeep Corporation. In 1970, it was purchased by American Motors Corporation (AMC). In July 2020, KPS Capital Partners acquired the company.

Defense and Government Products Division

In 1964, Kaiser-Jeep purchased the Studebaker facilities on Chippewa Avenue in South Bend, Indiana, which included Studebaker's "General Products Division", along with its substantial defense contracts.

At the time, Kaiser had been awarded a US$87 million Army truck contract, and under government pressure, agreed to perform the work at the South Bend plant it had recently acquired from Studebaker.

American Motors
American Motors Corporation (AMC) purchased the Jeep Corporation from Kaiser in 1970 when Kaiser decided to leave the auto business.

In 1971, AMC made the General Products Division of Jeep (producing military trucks as well as contract and non-commercial vehicles) a wholly owned subsidiary and renamed it AM General Corporation.

American Motors ceased to function as an independent automaker in 1982 when a controlling interest was purchased by Renault.

US government regulations at that time forbade ownership of defense contractors by foreign governments—and Renault was partially owned by the French government.

LTV Corporation
In 1983, LTV Corporation bought AM General and established it as a wholly owned subsidiary. In 1984, its headquarters moved from the American Motors AMTEK Building in Detroit, Michigan, to Livonia, Michigan, and two years later to South Bend, Indiana, where primary manufacturing operations were located.

Renco Group
In 1992, AM General was sold to Renco Group, which in 2002 converted it to a limited liability company.

Hummer brand
In 1984 AM General built a separate factory at 13200 McKinley Hwy in Mishawaka for HMMWV production.

In 1992 AM General began marketing the HMMWV to the civilian market under the Hummer brand. In 1999, GM acquired the rights to the brand and continued production of the original civilian Hummer as the H1 until June 2006.

The Hummer H2 went on the market in 2002, and was produced until January 2009. It was designed and marketed by GM, but manufactured by AM General at the Mishawaka plant. AM General did not build the H3 model.

GM was sued early in 2003 by DaimlerChrysler, owners of the Jeep brand, for the resemblance of the Hummer's seven-slot grille to Jeep's. The lawsuit was dismissed after acknowledgment of the shared corporate history of AMC and Jeep. GM in turn sued boutique automaker Avanti Motor Corporation of Cancun, Mexico after it introduced the Studebaker XUV at the Chicago Auto show in 2002. GM said Avanti infringed on the Hummer looks by planning a vehicle that closely resembled the Hummer. It seemed the AM General Hummer line had gone full circle back to the original Studebaker General Products Division which was responsible for all military contracts.

2004–present 
On August 20, 2004, it was announced that Ronald Perelman's MacAndrews & Forbes company would form a joint venture with AM General's then-owner, Renco Group, to give Perelman 70% ownership. The deal reportedly cost close to US$1 billion.

In 2008, AM General and the Vehicle Production Group (VPG), of Troy, Michigan, announced that contracts had been signed for AM General to begin producing purpose-built taxi-cabs in 2009. Actual production would not begin until October 2011. The first vehicle off the line was presented to Marc Buoniconti, a former linebacker for The Citadel who was partially paralyzed in 1985.

In May 2010, Azure Dynamics announced it had chosen AM General to assemble its electric drivetrain for Ford Transit Connect vehicles for the North American market at its Livonia, Michigan, factory.

In September 2013, AM General reached an agreement to purchase the United States Department of Energy's secured loan to the Vehicle Production Group (VPG). Prior to this, AM General acted as the sole vehicle assembler for VPG. As a result of this transaction, AM General created a wholly owned company, Mobility Ventures LLC, to operate the Mobility Vehicle-1 (MV-1) business and receive all VPG assets.

In 2015, production of the Mercedes-Benz R-Class began at the Mishawaka assembly plant. Without this deal, "the German automaker would likely have had to shut down production of the vehicle, currently only sold in China." Production ended in October 2017.

AM General submitted a prototype to become the United States Postal Service's Next Generation Delivery Vehicle, but their entry was not chosen.

Jeep Dispatcher 100

Another familiar product from the AM General line was the Jeep DJ-5 series—a purpose-built "Dispatch Jeep" 2-wheel drive (RWD) version of the Jeep CJ-5—used in huge numbers as a right-hand drive mail delivery vehicle by the United States Postal Service.

Buses 

The AM General Metropolitan buses were manufactured for city transit use from 1974 until 1979, producing a total of 5,431 buses (including 219 electric trolley buses). The Metropolitan was built under a 1971 agreement with Flyer Industries of Winnipeg, Manitoba; AM General licensed the rights to build and market the Western Flyer D700 for the US market. The D700 itself was similar in design to the contemporaneous GM New Look buses. The front end of the D700 was restyled and thus the resulting Metropolitan was not simply a Flyer design built under license but rather a jointly designed vehicle. Flyer later adopted the design changes for its own line as the models D800 and E800. The model numbers reflected the chosen dimensions; for example, model "10240" indicated a 102-inch wide, 40-foot long bus. Suffixes "A" or "B" were used for later models to indicate certain options. In total, 3,571 40-foot diesel buses and 1,641 35-foot diesel buses were produced.

Articulated buses

In 1977–1979, AM General also worked under a partnership with MAN of Germany to build SG 220 articulated buses for US transit systems. MAN fabricated the bodyshells in Germany and shipped them to the US for AM General for final assembly. By October 1978, the company discontinued bus production with the last unit completed in March 1979. The total number built was just under 400 (392 or 399), the largest group by far being 150 for Seattle's Metro Transit. MAN subsequently set up its own factory for US production in Cleveland, North Carolina.

Trolleybuses
Production of complete motor buses (and of any two-axle motor buses) had ended in 1978 and aside from the fitting-out of the last articulated MAN shells, the only production in 1979 was two batches of trolleybuses (and the only such vehicles ever built by the company). These were all  vehicles, model 10240T: 110 trackless trolleys for the Philadelphia trolleybus system, operated by SEPTA; and 109 for the Seattle trolleybus system, operated by Metro Transit (now King County Metro). One of the latter has been preserved since its retirement in 2003 by King County Metro (see King County Metro fleet).

Development and production of the HMMWV 

In 1979, AM General began preliminary design work on the M998 Series High Mobility Multi-Purpose Wheeled Vehicle (HMMWV, pronounced Humvee), a 1.25-ton truck intended to replace the M151 and other Light Utility Vehicles. The US Army awarded AM General a prototype contract in 1981 with development and operational testing conducted over a five-month period in 1982. In March 1983, AM General won an initial $1.2 billion contract to produce 55,000 Humvees to be delivered in five basic models and 15 different configurations over a five-year period.

Production began at the Mishawaka, Indiana, assembly plant in the fall of 1984 and the first deliveries were made in early 1985. The total international production by mid-1991 was more than 72,000. Since 1991, an additional 20,000 HMMWVs ordered brought total international production to 100,000 in March 1995.

Late in 2000, AM General was awarded another contract for 2,962 M998A2 series trucks. The contract contained six single-year options running to the fiscal year 2007 and continues to be renewed. Nearly 250,000 units have been produced.

More recent production models include the M1151, M1152, M1165, and M1167. As of 2015, Humvees are in use by the US Army, Marine Corps, Air Force, and Navy. The combined fleet numbers 140,000. More than 50 nations have bought these vehicles.

The Humvee's replacement, a completely new Joint Light Tactical Vehicle (JLTV) design, has been in production by Oshkosh Corporation since 2016. AM General was unsuccessful in its bid for this $30-billion 25-year contract, and it is now focused on military Humvee support (they still outnumber JLTVs by three to one) and development of a new ambulance model.

Other military vehicles 
AM General also acquired Department of Defense contracts for medium and heavy trucks, including the M151 series, 2 1/2 ton M35 series, and 5 ton M809 series in the 1970s then the M939 series in the 1980s.

In 2005, AM General was contracted to take over militarization, sales, and marketing of LSSV vehicles.

References

External links 

 AM General official site
 AM General Site History Page

Defense companies of the United States
Vehicle manufacturing companies established in 1971
Motor vehicle manufacturers based in Indiana
Companies based in St. Joseph County, Indiana
South Bend, Indiana
Bus manufacturers of the United States
American Motors
Military vehicle manufacturers
Car manufacturers of the United States
Trolleybus manufacturers
American companies established in 1971
1971 establishments in Indiana
Contract vehicle manufacturers
Electric vehicle manufacturers of the United States